Iron Hub is an unincorporated community in Rabbit Lake Township, Crow Wing County, Minnesota, United States, near Deerwood and Aitkin. It is along Iron Hub Road near Crow Wing County Road 32 and State Highway 210 (MN 210).

References

Unincorporated communities in Crow Wing County, Minnesota
Unincorporated communities in Minnesota